Julia Hanna Josefin Eriksson (born 7 July 1994) is a Swedish handball player who plays for Kastamonu Bld. GSK (women's handball). She was the 12th best scorer in the 2015–16 edition of Champions League (67 goals).

On April 5 2016, the European Handball Federation named her among the best young players of the 2015–16 EHF Champions League.

Achievements
Swedish Championship:
Winner: 2015, 2016

Individual awards
EHF Champions League Player of Main Round 4: 2016

References
 

  
1994 births
Living people
Handball players from Gothenburg
Swedish female handball players